Robert Hammond Patrick (born November 5, 1958) is an American actor. Known for portraying villains and honorable authority figures, he is a Saturn Award winner with four other nominations.

Patrick dropped out of college when drama class sparked his interest in acting, and entered film in 1986. After playing a supporting role in Die Hard 2 (1990), he came to prominence as the T-1000, the antagonist of Terminator 2: Judgment Day (1991)—a role he reprised for cameo appearances in Wayne's World (1992) and Last Action Hero (1993). His other film credits include Fire in the Sky (1993), Striptease (1996), Cop Land (1997), The Faculty (1998), Spy Kids (2001), Charlie's Angels: Full Throttle (2003), Ladder 49 (2004), Walk the Line (2005), Flags of Our Fathers (2006), We Are Marshall (2006), Bridge to Terabithia (2007), The Men Who Stare at Goats (2009), and Safe House (2012).

In television, Patrick played FBI Special Agent John Doggett in The X-Files, Colonel Tom Ryan in The Unit, DHS agent Cabe Gallo in Scorpion, and Auggie Smith / White Dragon in Peacemaker. He has played ongoing roles in series such as The Outer Limits, The Sopranos, Elvis, Burn Notice, Last Resort, Sons of Anarchy, its spin-off Mayans M.C., and From Dusk till Dawn: The Series.

Described by The Guardian as a character actor, AllMovie journalist Tracie Cooper wrote that, by the conclusion of The X-Files in 2002, Patrick had developed a "solid reputation within the industry", with critics, fans and co-stars alike praising his "work ethic, personality, and consistent performances." Actor and director Jason Bateman described Patrick as "one of the great heavies."

Early life
Patrick was born in Marietta, Georgia, on November 5, 1958, and raised there, as well as in Boston, Massachusetts, Dayton, Ohio, Detroit, Michigan, and Bay Village, Ohio. He is the eldest of five children born to Nadine and Robert M. Patrick, and is of Scots-Irish and English descent. His brother, Richard, is best known as the lead singer for the rock band Filter.

He did not start to pursue an acting career until his mid-twenties. During his childhood, he did not like to act; in third grade, he refused to wear a pair of green tights required for Peter Pan. He graduated from Farmington High School in Farmington, Michigan in 1977. He was a track and field and football athlete at Bowling Green State University. He dropped out before graduating when he found an interest in drama and acting. After leaving college, Patrick worked as a house painter and continued as such until a boating accident in 1984 in Lake Erie. He swam for three hours in order to save others still stranded on the accident site, and nearly drowned in doing so. After the accident, he moved to Los Angeles at age 26. His main income during his first years was as a bartender, and he often lived in his car, before being cast in his first film roles.

Career

Patrick first appeared in several low-budget science-fiction and action films produced by Roger Corman and shot in the Philippines by Cirio H. Santiago. Looking back, he credited his early appearances in films to his "tough-looking exterior". He played leading roles in pictures such as Eye of the Eagle, Equalizer 2000 or Future Hunters. Patrick later commented that his experience with Santiago had been his "film school". The B movies he made in the Philippines helped him get an SAG card. Patrick's first major Hollywood film was Die Hard 2, in a small part as a henchman for Colonel Stuart, before landing the role of the T-1000, the villain of James Cameron's Terminator 2: Judgment Day (1991). Cameron said he chose Patrick because of his physical appearance, which he felt fit the role. Patrick was "broke" at the time, living in a cheap apartment with his girlfriend, Barbara, whom he married during shooting. He has credited the film with starting his career.

After Terminator 2, Patrick landed roles in various feature films such as Last Action Hero, Fire in the Sky (both 1993) and Striptease (1996). Because of his fondness for martial arts, Patrick starred in two martial arts films titled Double Dragon and Hong Kong 97, both released in 1994, and even had a fight scene with taekwondo master Hwang Jang-Lee in Future Hunters (1988). His performance in Fire in the Sky led The X-Files creator Chris Carter to cast him in that series for the role of John Doggett. Patrick's brother, Richard, had previously worked for the series by adding music for the soundtrack album The X-Files: The Album. Patrick was cast as Doggett in 2000. The X-Files was canceled two seasons later, after Duchovny left the show following season 7, which resulted in low ratings for the show. Patrick made several appearances on many genre magazines, with TV Guide going so far as to label him one of the Ten Sexiest Men of Sci-Fi.

In 2000, Patrick appeared in three episodes of The Sopranos ("The Happy Wanderer", "Bust Out" and "Funhouse") as David "Davey" Scatino, a store owner struggling with gambling debts owed to Richie Aprile and Tony Soprano. Four years later, he made a guest appearance in the pilot episodes for Sci-Fi Channel's original series Stargate Atlantis, "Rising", as the military component commander of the Atlantis expedition, Marshall Sumner. He accepted the role, since he had worked with the same crew on The Outer Limits, a series which he appeared in during the early 1990s.

Patrick played Johnny Cash's father, Ray Cash, in the film Walk the Line and Elvis's father, Vernon Presley in the miniseries Elvis. In 2003, he appeared in Charlie's Angels: Full Throttle, which reunited him with his Striptease co-star, Demi Moore. He had a regular role on The Unit, and played Elvis Presley in Lonely Street (2009). In October 2006, he starred in the WWE Films production The Marine as Rome. He also appeared in We Are Marshall as Marshall University head coach Rick Tolley, who lost his life when Southern Airways Flight 932 crashed in 1970. His credits also include a guest starring role in the Lost episode "Outlaws", as well as a recurring role as the voice of Master Piandao in season 3 of the Nickelodeon animated series Avatar: The Last Airbender. Patrick played a supporting role in Firewall, a 2006 action film starring Harrison Ford. He has also appeared in Meat Loaf's music video "Objects in the Rear View Mirror May Appear Closer than They Are" with Will Estes.

Director McG, who directed Terminator Salvation, said that he wanted to reintroduce characters from the previous Terminator films: "I like the idea and the perspective for the next picture that you meet Robert Patrick the way he looks today, and he's a scientist that's working on, you know, improving cell replication so we can stay healthier and we can cure diabetes and do all these things that sound like good ideas, and to once again live as idealized expressions as ourselves." Patrick also starred in the psychological thriller The Black Water of Echo's Pond, which was directed by Italian filmmaker Gabriel Bologna. In recent years, he has appeared in such television series as Burn Notice, NCIS and True Blood, among others. From 2012 to 2013, he also starred in Last Resort as Chief of the Boat Joseph Prosser. He played a supporting character in Identity Thief (2013). From 2014 to 2016, he starred in Robert Rodriguez's From Dusk Till Dawn: The Series as Jacob Fuller. He also played Agent Cabe Gallo on the CBS drama series Scorpion from 2014 to 2018.

On March 28, 2017, Patrick was cast in Amazon Video horror anthology series Lore, which is based on the award-winning and critically acclaimed podcast of the same name. Lore recounts true stories of frightening and paranormal occurrences. Lore premiered on October 13, 2017, and has been renewed for a second season. In 2021, Patrick starred in Rushed, co-produced by Lars von Trier's Zentropa Entertainment, and written by Siobhan Fallon Hogan. Also starring Jake Weary and Peri Gilpin, Vertical Entertainment has acquired the distribution rights.
In 2022, Robert Patrick played Auggie Smith / White Dragon, the racist supervillain father of Peacemaker in the HBO Max series Peacemaker, and he voiced Wolverine in the Marvel's Wastelanders: Wolverine podcast.

Personal life
Patrick married actress Barbara Hooper in 1990. They have appeared together in various films and TV shows such as Zero Tolerance and The X-Files. They have two children: a son and a daughter.

Patrick is a devout Episcopalian. He is also a member of the Boozefighters motorcycle club.

On October 22, 2010, in Dallas, Texas, Patrick joined his brother Richard's band Filter onstage to provide guest vocals on a performance of their song "So I Quit".

Filmography

Film

Television

Video games

Awards and nominations

References

External links

 
 Robert Patrick on TVGuide.com

1958 births
Living people
American Episcopalians
American football linebackers
American male film actors
American male television actors
American male video game actors
American male voice actors
American people of British descent
American people of English descent
American people of Scotch-Irish descent
Bowling Green Falcons football players
Bowling Green State University alumni
Male actors from Georgia (U.S. state)
People from Bay Village, Ohio
People from Marietta, Georgia
20th-century American male actors
21st-century American male actors